Baroness Eva Charlotta Lovisa Sofia (Sophie) Mannerheim (21 December 1863 – 9 January 1928) was a famous nurse known as pioneer of modern nursing in Finland. She was daughter of count Carl Robert Mannerheim and sister of a former Finnish President, marshal Carl Gustaf Emil Mannerheim, as well as the artist and writer Eva Mannerheim-Sparre. Her career started as a bank employee for 6 years until she married in 1896. After her divorce in 1902 she was trained in nursing at the Nightingale School at St Thomas' Hospital in London. Returning home she was appointed as head nurse of Helsinki Surgical Hospital and later elected President of the Finnish Nurses' Association, a position she had for 24 years. As a result of her international involvement she was also elected President of the International Council of Nurses (ICN). Sophie Mannerheim was, together with Dr Arvo Ylppö,  founder of the Children's Castle (Lastenlinna) hospital in Helsinki as well as the Mannerheim League for Child Welfare.

References 

1863 births
1928 deaths
People from Helsinki
Sophie
Finnish people of German descent
Finnish people of Scottish descent
Finnish people of Swedish descent
Swedish-speaking Finns
Finnish nurses
19th-century Finnish nobility
19th-century Swedish nobility
19th-century Finnish women